Ivor Neville Kamen (15 April 1962 – 4 May 2021) was an English singer-songwriter, musician and model. He was best known for "Turn It Up" from 1989, the singles "Each Time You Break My Heart" from 1986 and "I Promised Myself" from 1990, as well as for appearing in a 1985 Levi's advert.

Early life 
Kamen was born in Harlow, Essex, England, where he attended St Marks RC Comprehensive School. He was the seventh of eight children, with four sisters and three brothers, Ronald Kamen, Chester Kamen and Barry Kamen.

Career 
In 1982, Kamen appeared in the video for The Damned Don't Cry by British synthpop band Visage. He first came to the public's attention in 1984 when Ray Petri featured him on the front cover of The Face. The cover showed him wearing a ski-hat, lipstick, orange roll-neck sweater and aviator sunglasses.

He is best known in the UK for his appearance in the 1985 Levi's  "Launderette" commercial, where he strips down to wash his blue jeans in a 1950s style public launderette while he waits, clad only in his Sunspel boxer shorts. It was one of a series of Bartle Bogle Hegarty advertisements that dramatically increased sales of Levi 501s. The commercial ranked sixth in The 100 Greatest TV Ads in 2000.

Kamen's musical success was mainly in Europe. His first single was the 1986 UK Number 5 hit "Each Time You Break My Heart” from his eponymous début album. The song was written and produced by Madonna and frequent Madonna collaborator, Stephen Bray, with Madonna also singing background vocals. Her original demo remains one of many unreleased Madonna songs by the artist herself. Kamen also had a Number 16 follow-up in the UK with his second single, "Loving You Is Sweeter Than Ever" (a cover of the Four Tops' 1966 hit), although his later singles were less commercially successful in the UK but more so in the rest of Europe, particularly Italy, France, Germany, and Spain.

His second album Us (1988) was produced by another Madonna frequent collaborator, Patrick Leonard. Madonna again made an appearance with background vocals on the song "Tell Me", this time without contributing to the songwriting or production. The song became a massive hit in Italy in the summer of 1988, spending a total of nine weeks at Number 1.  Later in 1988 a WEA Italiana compilation Loving You, containing mainly extended versions of previous singles, reached number 7 on the Italian album charts. In 1989, Kamen performed the song "Turn It Up" on the soundtrack to the Disney film Honey, I Shrunk the Kids.

Kamen's third album Move Until We Fly was released in 1990 and contained another big European hit, the single "I Promised Myself". The song reached the top ten in several European countries and was the fourth most played record in Europe in 1990. The song was later covered by Dead or Alive (1999), A-Teens (2004), Basshunter (2009), and by German punk rockers Maggers United (2013).

His 1988 European single "Bring Me Your Love" has a Cantonese cover version sung by 張立基 (Norman Cheung) which titled "今夜你是否人 (Are You Alone?)" reached Number 1 on the airplay chart in Hong Kong in 1989.

Kamen appeared on UK television, singing on Top of the Pops (27 November 1986 and 12 March 1987), This Morning (9 April 1990), Night Network (15 April 1987, 19 August 1987 and 1988) and The Tube (31 October 1986 and 21 November 1986). On his first appearance on Top of the Pops, he was introduced by Gary Davies and sang "Each Time You Break My Heart” and on his second appearance, he was introduced by Steve Wright and sang "Loving You Is Sweeter Than Ever”. On both occasions, his brother Chester Kamen was on guitar and the singer-songwriters Sonny Southon and Zara Phillips were on backing vocals.

In 1992, Kamen released his final album, titled Whatever, Whenever.

Cherry Red Records released his debut album as a two-disc deluxe edition in 2015, followed by the six CD box set The Complete Collection in 2020.

Death 
Kamen died at his London home on 4 May 2021, aged 59, following a three-year-long battle with bone marrow cancer. He had been receiving treatment at Hammersmith Hospital, West London. After his death, Madonna paid tribute, writing, "You were always such a kind, sweet human and you suffered too much". Later in May 2021, Kamen's brother, musician Chester Kamen, released the track "Stories" performed by his band The Twins: "Dedicated to the memory of my two beloved little brothers, Nick and Barry".

Discography

Albums

Singles

References

External links 

 Obituary in The Independent by Marcus Williamson
 
 

1962 births
2021 deaths
20th-century English singers
20th-century British male singers
Atlantic Records artists
Cherry Red Records artists
Deaths from blood cancer
Deaths from cancer in England
English male models
English male singers
English pop singers
English songwriters
People from Harlow
Singers from Essex
Sire Records artists
British male songwriters